Tosia is a Polish feminine given name that is a diminutive form of Antonina or Antonia used in Poland. Notable people with this name include the following:

Given name
Tosia Altman (1919 – 1943), Polish resistance courier and smuggler
Tosia Malamud (1923 – 2008), Ukrainian sculptor

See also

Tonia (name)
Topia (disambiguation)
Tosa (disambiguation)
Tosca (disambiguation)
Tosin (given name)

References

 Polish feminine given names